Scholes is a hamlet on Oldfield Lane and Hob Cote Lane, in the City of Bradford district, in the county of West Yorkshire, England. Nearby settlements include the town of Keighley, the village of Oakworth and the hamlet of Oldfield.

References 
 A-Z West Yorkshire (page 41)

Hamlets in West Yorkshire
Keighley